Nord is the debut full-length album by French post-metal band Year of No Light, released in 2006. It was originally released by Radar Swarm (CD), E-Vinyl & Atropine (LP), and reissued later by Crucial Blast for the U.S. version.

Track listing

Personnel
Year of No Light
 Bertrand Sébenne – drums
 Jérôme Alban – guitar
 Pierre Anouilh – guitar
 Julien Perez – vocals, keyboards
 Johan Sébenne – bass

Technical personnel
 Serge Morattel – engineering and mixing
 Alan Douches – mastering
 Greg Vezon – album art and design

References

Year of No Light albums
2006 debut albums